Tilloclytus rufipes is a species of longhorn beetle in the Cerambycinae subfamily. It was described by Fisher in 1942. It is known from Cuba.

References

Anaglyptini
Beetles described in 1942
Endemic fauna of Cuba